Kingdom of Galicia was a political entity in the Iberian Peninsula

Kingdom of Galicia may also refer to:

 Kingdom of Galicia–Volhynia, a medieval state in eastern Europe 
 Kingdom of Galicia and Lodomeria, a crownland of the Habsburg Monarchy

or:
 Kingdom of the Suebi